Copenhagen Municipality is the largest municipality in Denmark. It has in its history been a strong area for parties of the red bloc. In the 2019 Danish general election, it became the municipality where the bloc received the highest % of votes. It is different from other municipalities as it has a total of 7 mayor positions. The biggest and most important one is the Lord Mayor, which has been held by the Social Democrats since 1938.

In the 2017 election, the Social Democrats had won 14 seats, and had become the largest party. It had then been Frank Jensen from the party who had won the Lord Mayor's position, going into his third term.

In 2020, Jensen was accused of having sexually harassed a woman from the Social Democratic Youth of Denmark in 2012. He eventually replied in text - ”I’m very sad about what happended, and I want to apologize for this happening in our party. It’s not an acceptable behaviour, neither then or today. On behalf of the party – sorry Maria!!!”. Three days later he would step down as Lord Mayor.

Lars Weiss would become working Lord Mayor following this. He would however announce that he would not contest the 2021 election, and that he would only be the Lord Mayor until the next election. Instead Sophie Hæstorp Andersen, who was chair of the Capital Region of Denmark at the time, would be the only one standing to be the Social Democrats Lord Mayor candidate.

In November 2020, an opinion poll was released showing the Social Democrats as the largest party by a slim margin of 1.6%. The Social Democrats had previously always been the largest party in the municipality. In October 2021, Epinion released an opinion poll that had the Red–Green Alliance, who had become the largest party in Copenhagen Municipality in the 2019 Danish general election, as the largest party for the municipality election. Gallup released an opinion poll 17 days later, and four days prior to the election, that also had the Red–Green Alliance as the largest party.

In the election result, the Red–Green Alliance would indeed manage to become the largest party, with a margin of 7.4%. They gained four seats, while the Social Democrats lost five. Despite this, it proved hard for the Red–Green Alliance to actually win the Lord Mayor's position. Right-wing and centre-right parties Liberal Alliance and Venstre had said prior to the election they would be ready to support Sophie Hæstorp Andersen as the new mayor, to prevent the Red–Green Alliance from winning the position. Following the result, the leader of the Red–Green Alliance reacted with joy, saying she hoped that the party could secure the Lord Mayor's position with a green majority consisting of themselves, Danish Social Liberal Party, the Green Left and the The Alternative. Eventually however, it was announced that Sophie Hæstorp Andersen would be the new mayor. Line Barfod from the Red–Green Alliance joined the agreement, citing that the Danish Social Liberal Party would not support her, and that the Social Democrats would rather work with the right-wing parties than support her. To prevent the former from happening, she decided that the Red–Green Alliance should be a part of the agreement making Sophie Hæstorp Andersen the new mayor. In return, the Red–Green Alliance would get 2 of the 6 minor mayor positions.

Electoral system
For elections to Danish municipalities, a number varying from 9 to 31 are chosen to be elected to the municipal council. However Copenhagen Municipality has, as the only one, a city council instead of a municipal council. In the city council 55 seats are contested.

The seats are then allocated using the D'Hondt method and a closed list proportional representation.

Unlike in Danish General Elections, in elections to city councils, electoral alliances are allowed.

Electoral alliances  

Electoral Alliance 1

Electoral Alliance 2

Electoral Alliance 3

Electoral Alliance 4

Electoral Alliance 5

Results

Notes

References 

Copenhagen